Sinistrofulgur contrarium is a fossil snail species of the busycon whelks in the family Busyconidae. There has been some confusion about the correct taxonomy of this species, which has been confused with the extant species Sinistrofulgur sinistrum Hollister, 1958, and Sinistrofulgur perversum (Linnaeus, 1758)

References

contrarium
Gastropods described in 1840
Taxa named by Timothy Abbott Conrad